Jerry Alban Lamb (born September 4, 1940) is a retired American bishop. He was the sixth bishop of the Episcopal Diocese of Northern California.

Background 
Lamb was born in Denver, Colorado. He attended the Roman Catholic St. Thomas Seminary in Denver, where he received a Bachelor of Arts degree in 1964 and a Master of Arts degree in 1966. In 1973 he received an M.A. in counseling from the University of Oregon. Lamb was received into the Episcopal Church and ordained to the diaconate in March 1977. On August 15, 1977, he was ordained to the priesthood in the Episcopal Diocese of Oregon.

Lamb was elected Bishop Coadjutor of Northern California in 1991 and was consecrated on June 9 of that year. In 1992, he became the diocesan bishop. Also in 1992 he was awarded an honorary Doctor of Divinity degree from The Church Divinity School of the Pacific. He is the 868th bishop consecrated into the historical episcopate of the Episcopal Church.

Lamb retired at the end of 2006 and was succeeded by the Rev. Canon Barry L. Beisner. He was then appointed assisting bishop of Nevada after the election of Bishop Katharine Jefferts Schori as presiding bishop.

In March 2008, Lamb was appointed to administer the Episcopal Diocese of San Joaquin in central California after Bishop John-David Schofield and at least 40 parishes left the Episcopal Church for the Anglican Province of the Southern Cone. About seven congregations are still Episcopal.

External links
The Electronic Clerical Directory, Church Publishing, Inc.
Diocese of Northern California website

1940 births
Living people
People from Denver
Converts to Anglicanism from Roman Catholicism
University of Oregon alumni
Episcopal bishops of Northern California
Episcopal bishops of San Joaquin
Episcopal bishops of Nevada